Commonwealth v. Donoghue, 250 Ky. 343, 63 S.W.2d 3 (1933), was a case decided by the Kentucky Court of Appeals involving conspiracy based on common law criminal offenses imported through reception statutes.

Background 
M. Donoghue and others ran the Boone Loan Company in Kenton County, which was accused of charging usury rates of interest, or loan sharking. The judge created the crime in the case: "a nefarious plan for the habitual exaction of gross injury".

Decision
The Court of Appeals upheld the ability of judges to create common law crimes in the state of Kentucky.

Later developments 
In 1975 a Kentucky state statute, KRS 500.020, prohibited the prosecution of common law crimes in Kentucky, rendering the decision in Commonwealth v. Donoghue to be of no further effect.

See also
State v. Palendrano, a similar case in New Jersey which reached a different conclusion.

References

U.S. state criminal case law
1933 in United States case law
Kentucky state case law
1933 in Kentucky
Kenton County, Kentucky
Informal finance
Common law